Suphisellus grammicus is a species of burrowing water beetle in the subfamily Noterinae. It was described by Sharp in 1882 and is found in Argentina, Bolivia, Brazil, Paraguay and Peru.

References

Suphisellus
Beetles described in 1882